"Big Booty Bitches" is a song recorded by the Australian duo Bombs Away. The song was released digitally in October 2010 and remixes followed in November. The song peaked at number 55 on the Australian ARIA Charts and was certified gold in 2013.

Track listing
Digital download
 "Big Booty Bitches" (Dirtyloud Mix) – 5:26 
 "Big Booty Bitches" (Dirtyloud Instrumental) – 5:26

Digital download (remixes)
 "Big Booty Bitches" (Original Mix) – 5:34
 "Big Booty Bitches" (Thomas Hart Mix) – 6:06
 "Big Booty Bitches" (Rave Radio Mix) – 5:03
 "Big Booty Bitches" (Ryan Riback Big Mix) – 7:19
 "Big Booty Bitches" (Original Radio Edit) – 3:18  
 "Big Booty Bitches" (Clean Radio Edit) – 3:22

Charts

Certification

Release History

References

2010 singles
2010 songs
Bombs Away (group) songs
Shock Records singles